Serrata granum is a species of sea snail, a marine gastropod mollusk in the family Marginellidae, the margin snails.

Description
The size of the shell attains 4 mm.

Distribution
This marine species occurs off New Caledonia (depth range 381-469 m).

References

 Boyer F. (2008) The genus Serrata Jousseaume, 1875 (Caenogastropoda: Marginellidae) in New Caledonia. In: V. Héros, R.H. Cowie & P. Bouchet (eds), Tropical Deep-Sea Benthos 25. Mémoires du Muséum National d'Histoire Naturelle 196: 389–436

External links
 

Marginellidae
Gastropods described in 2008